Cometary Orbital Drive is an album by Acid Mothers Temple & The Melting Paraiso U.F.O., released in 2008 by Bam Balam.Records Vinyl LP version is titled Episodes Of Cometary Orbital Drive and contain different mix, but does not contain the entire album.
It was Released by Bam Balam.Records, a French label from Bordeaux.

Track listing

CD

Episodes Of Cometary Orbital Drive LP

Personnel

Credits, as stated on the liner notes:
 Tsuyama Atsushi - bass, voice, cosmic joker
 Higashi Hiroshi - synth, guitar, voice, dancin' king
 Shimura Koji - drums, Latino cool
 Kawabata Makoto - guitar, voice, speed guru.

Technical personnel
 Kawabata Makoto - production & engineering
 Yoshida Tatsuya - digital mastering
 Niko Potocnjak - art work

References

2009 albums
Acid Mothers Temple albums